Stefan Kraft (born 13 May 1993) is an Austrian ski jumper. He is one of the most successful contemporary athletes in ski jumping, having won the Ski Jumping World Cup and Ski Flying World Cup overall titles twice each, the Four Hills Tournament and Raw Air Tournament once each, and three individual gold medals at the World Championships.

Career

Kraft's debut in FIS Ski Jumping World Cup took place in January 2012 in Bischofshofen. He has two world cup wins and won 2014/15 Four Hills Tournament overall. His personal best and world record is 253.5 meters set in Vikersund in 2017, only half a meter away from Dimitry Vassiliev's 254-meter jump, the longest to date. At FIS Nordic World Ski Championships 2015 in Falun, he won the silver medal from Men's team large hill event and bronze from Individual normal hill event.

In March 2017, he clinched his first overall FIS Ski Jumping World Cup title.

World Cup results

Season titles
 4 titles – (2 Overall, 2 Ski flying)

Season standings

Wins

Individual starts (237)

Podiums

Ski jumping world record
Current world record longest standing ski jump in the world.

Olympic results

World Championships
 12 medals – (3 gold, 5 silver, 4 bronze)

References

External links

1993 births
Living people
Austrian male ski jumpers
FIS Nordic World Ski Championships medalists in ski jumping
People from St. Johann im Pongau District
Ski jumpers at the 2018 Winter Olympics
Ski jumpers at the 2022 Winter Olympics
Olympic ski jumpers of Austria
Olympic gold medalists for Austria
Olympic medalists in ski jumping
Medalists at the 2022 Winter Olympics
World record setters in ski flying
Sportspeople from Salzburg (state)
21st-century Austrian people